The Eureka is a machine for generating Latin verses, created and exhibited in the mid-19th century by the Quaker inventor John Clark of Bridgwater.
Clark, a cousin of Cyrus Clark, was born at Greinton in Somerset in 1785 and moved to Bridgwater in 1809.  There he was first a grocer and later a printer.  In 1830 he started work on the Eureka and was able to exhibit it in 1845 in the Egyptian Hall in Picadilly. Visitors, for the admission price of one shilling, could see a machine that resembled a ‘small bureau bookcase’, with six narrow windows in the front.  As it prepared each new verse, the machine would play the National Anthem, becoming silent after about a minute, when the verse was complete.
The verses created by the Eureka were gloomy and oracular hexameters, created to a single format, which allowed for many combinations, all metrically sound and (more or less) meaningful.

This method of verse creation was certainly not Clark’s invention: already in 1677 a John Peter had published a work, "Artificial Versifying, A New Way to Make Latin Verses".  Clark’s contribution was to fully automate this process.

The mechanism was a series of six drums turning at different rates within the cabinet. The words were not simply printed on the drums, but encoded as rows of stop wires of different lengths, onto which wooden staves would be dropped.  The staves had any letters that might be needed printed on them in a vertical series, and would fall onto the stop wires with the desired letter opposite the window for the word.  
After Clark’s death in 1853, the machine passed first to his nephew and then to his cousins Cyrus and James Clark.  Since 1950, when it was repaired after a period of neglect, it has been housed in the Records Office of Clarks’ factory in Street, Somerset.

References
W. Pinkerton, "Machine Hexameters" Notes and Queries Series 2, No. 3, 1856, 57-9
E. Bensly, "Latin Hexameters by Machinery: John Peter" Notes and Queries Series 3, No. 11, 1911, 249-251
D.W. Blandford, "The Eureka" Greece and Rome 10, 1963, 71-78
C. Stray, Classics Transformed Oxford 1998, xi and 70
J.D. Hall, "Popular Prosody: Spectacle and the Politics of Victorian Versification" Nineteenth-Century Literature 62, 2007, 222-249.
The Eureka, The London Illustrated News, July 19, 1845, p. 37 online

See also
Generative_art#Literature

English inventions
Latin poetry